Aconodes persimilis is a species of beetle in the family Cerambycidae. It was described by Stephan von Breuning in 1939. It is known from India.

It's 10½–12 mm long and 2⅔–3 mm wide, and its type locality is the Nilgiri mountains.

References

Aconodes
Beetles described in 1939
Taxa named by Stephan von Breuning (entomologist)